Gentiana pedicellata, the purple stalked gentian, is a plant that belongs to the genus Gentiana.

Description 

Leaves are lance-shaped, 5-20 mm long, the basal leaves, when present, are much larger and broader. Purple stalked gentian is found in the Himalayas, from Pakistan to Burma, the Nilgiri Mountains and China at altitudes of 750-3800 m. Its habitats include bogs, meadows, and roadside slopes.

References 

pedecillata
Flora of China
Flora of Pakistan